Elisha A. Howland (27 February 1832 – 20 January 1905) was an American politician.

Howland was born in Rutland, New York on 27 February 1832, and later moved to Iowa. He married Sarah L. Wyatt in Hamilton County, Iowa, on 8 December 1870. They settled in Morgan Township, Franklin County, Iowa, where Howland was a farmer. He was affiliated with the Republican Party and served on the township board of supervisors. Between 1972 and 1876, he was a member of the Iowa Senate, representing District 46, which included Franklin County. Howland died on 20 January 1905.

References

Farmers from Iowa
People from Jefferson County, New York
People from Franklin County, Iowa
County supervisors in Iowa
1905 deaths
Republican Party Iowa state senators
1832 births
19th-century American politicians